List of comics based on Hasbro properties.

Publications

Action Man 

 Action Man (2003, Panini Comics)
 Action Man (2004)
 Action Man: X Missions
 Action Man (2016, IDW Publishing)
 Action Man: Revolution (2016, IDW Publishing)

Clue 

 Clue (2017, IDW Publishing)
 Clue: Candlestick (2019, IDW Publishing)

Dungeons & Dragons 

 Advanced Dungeons & Dragons (1988–1991, DC Comics)
 Dragonlance (1988–1991, DC Comics)
 Dragonlance Chronicles (2005–2006, Devil's Due Publishing)
 Dragonlance Chronicles (2006–2007, Devil's Due Publishing)
 Dragonlance Chronicles (2007–2008, Devil's Due Publishing)
 Dungeons & Dragons (2010–2012, IDW Publishing)
 Dungeons & Dragons: Neverwinter Tales — The Legend of Drizzt (2010–2012, IDW Publishing)
 Infestation 2: Dungeons & Dragons: Eberron (2011, IDW Publishing)
 Dungeons & Dragons: Forgotten Realms (2012, IDW Publishing)
 Dungeons & Dragons: Cutter (2013, IDW Publishing)
 Dungeons & Dragons: Legends of Baldur's Gate (2014–2015, IDW Publishing)
 Dungeons & Dragons: Shadows of the Vampire (2016, IDW Publishing)
 Dungeons & Dragons: Frost Giant's Fury (2017, IDW Publishing)
 Dungeons & Dragons: Evil At Baldur's Gate (2018, IDW Publishing)
 Dungeons & Dragons: Infernal Tides (2019–2020, IDW Publishing)
 Dungeons & Dragons: A Darkened Wish (2019–2020, IDW Publishing)
 Dungeons & Dragons: At the Spine of the World (2020–2021, IDW Publishing)
Dungeons & Dragons: Mindbreaker (2021–2022, IDW Publishing)
Dungeons & Dragons: Best of Minsc & Boo (2022, IDW Publishing)
Dungeons & Dragons: Ravenloft — Orphan of Agony Isle (2022, IDW Publishing)
Dungeons & Dragons Sampler (2023, IDW Publishing)
Dungeons & Dragons: Honor Among Thieves — The Feast of the Moon (2023, IDW Publishing)
Dungeons & Dragons: Saturday Morning Adventures (2023, IDW Publishing)

G.I. Joe 

 G.I. Joe: A Real American Hero (1982–1994, Marvel Comics)
 G.I. Joe: Yearbook (1985, Marvel Comics)
 G.I. Joe: Special Missions (1986, Marvel Comics)
 G.I. Joe: A Real American Hero (2001, Image Comics and Devil's Due Publishing)
 G.I. Joe (2008–2011, IDW Publishing)
 G.I. Joe: Origins (2009–2011, IDW Publishing)
 G.I. Joe: Cobra (2009, IDW Publishing)
 G.I. Joe: Cobra Special (2009–2010, IDW Publishing)
 G.I. Joe: Cobra II (2010–2011, IDW Publishing)
 G.I. Joe: Hearts & Minds (2010, IDW Publishing)
 G.I. Joe: A Real American Hero (2010–2022, IDW Publishing)
 G.I. Joe: Infestation (2011, IDW Publishing)
 G.I. Joe: Cobra Civil War (2011, IDW Publishing)
 G.I. Joe (2011–2013, IDW Publishing)
 G.I. Joe: Cobra (2011–2012, IDW Publishing)
 G.I. Joe: Snake Eyes (2011–2013, IDW Publishing)
 Infestation 2: G.I. Joe (2012, IDW Publishing)
 G.I. Joe (2013–2014, IDW Publishing)
 G.I. Joe: Special Missions (2013–2014, IDW Publishing)
 G.I. Joe: The Cobra Files (2013–2014, IDW Publishing)
 G.I. Joe (2014–2015, IDW Publishing)
 G.I. Joe: Snake Eyes — Agent of Cobra (2015, IDW Publishing)
 G.I. Joe: Revolution (2015, IDW Publishing)
 G.I. Joe (2016–2017, IDW Publishing)
 G.I. Joe: First Strike (2017, IDW Publishing)
 Scarlett’s Strike Force (2017–2018, IDW Publishing)
 G.I. Joe: A Real American Hero — Silent Option (2018–2019, IDW Publishing)
 G.I. Joe: Sierra Muerte (2019, IDW Publishing)
 G.I. Joe (2019–2020, IDW Publishing)
 G.I. Joe: A Real American Hero — Yearbook 2019 (2019, IDW Publishing)
 G.I. Joe: A Real American Hero — Complete Silence (2020, IDW Publishing)
 Snake Eyes: Deadgame (2020–2021, IDW Publishing)
 G.I. Joe: Castle Fall (2021, IDW Publishing)
 G.I. Joe: A Real American Hero — Yearbook 2021 (2021, IDW Publishing)
 G.I. Joe: A Real American Hero — Serpentor Uncoiled (2021, IDW Publishing)
Snake Eyes: Deadgame — Declassified (2021, IDW Publishing)
G.I. Joe: A Real American Hero — Saturday Morning Adventures (2022, IDW Publishing)
G.I. Joe: A Real American Hero — Yo Joe! (2022, IDW Publishing)
G.I. Joe: A Real American Hero — Cobraaaa! (2022, IDW Publishing)
G.I. Joe: A Real American Hero — 40th Anniversary Special (2022, IDW Publishing)
G.I. Joe: A Real American Hero — Best of Snake Eyes (2022, IDW Publishing)
G.I. Joe: A Real American Hero — Rise Of Serpentor (2022, IDW Publishing)
G.I. Joe: A Real American Hero — Best of Storm Shadow (2022, IDW Publishing)

Inhumanoids 
 Inhumanoids (1987, Star Comics)

Jem and the Holograms 

 Jem and the Holograms (2015–2017, IDW Publishing)
 Jem: The Misfits (2016–2017, IDW Publishing)
 Jem: Infinite (2017, IDW Publishing)
 Jem: The Misfits: Infinite (2017, IDW Publishing)
 Jem: Dimensions (2017–2018, IDW Publishing)
 Jem 20/20 (2020, IDW Publishing)

M.A.S.K.: Mobile Armored Strike Kommand 
 M.A.S.K. (1985–1986, DC Comics)
 M.A.S.K.: Mobile Armored Strike Kommand: Revolution (2016, IDW Publishing)
 M.A.S.K.: Mobile Armored Strike Kommand (2016–2017, IDW Publishing)
 M.A.S.K.: Mobile Armored Strike Kommand: First Strike (2017, IDW Publishing)

Magic: The Gathering 

 Magic: The Gathering — The Shadow Mage (1995, Acclaim Comics)
 Ice Age on the World of Magic: The Gathering (1995, Acclaim Comics)
 Magic: The Gathering — Nightmare (1995, Acclaim Comics)
 Fallen Empires on the World of Magic: The Gathering (1995, Acclaim Comics)
 Magic: The Gathering: Wayfarer (1995, Acclaim Comics)
 Antiquities War on the World of Magic: The Gathering (1995–1996, Acclaim Comics)
 Magic: The Gathering — Arabian Nights (1995–1996, Acclaim Comics)
 Convocations: A Magic: The Gathering Gallery (1996, Acclaim Comics)
 Serra Angel on the World of Magic: The Gathering (1996, Acclaim Comics)
 Homelands on the World of Magic: The Gathering (1996, Acclaim Comics)
 Legend of Jedit Ojanen on the World of Magic: The Gathering (1996, Acclaim Comics)
 Magic: The Gathering — Shandalar (1996, Acclaim Comics)
 Fallen Angel: A Magic: The Gathering Legend (1996, Acclaim Comics)
 Elder Dragons: A Magic: The Gathering Legend (1996, Acclaim Comics)
 Magic: The Gathering — Dakkon Blackblade (1996, Acclaim Comics)
 Urza-Mishra War on the World of Magic: The Gathering (1996, Acclaim Comics)
 Magic: The Gathering — Gerrard's Quest (1998, Dark Horse Comics)
 Magic: The Gathering (2011–2012, IDW Publishing)
 Magic: The Gathering — The Spell Thief (2012, IDW Publishing)
 Magic: The Gathering — Path of Vengeance (2012–2013, IDW Publishing)
 Magic: The Gathering — Theros (2013–2014, IDW Publishing)
 Magic: The Gathering — Chandra (2018–2019, IDW Publishing)
 Magic: The Gathering — Trials of Alara (2020, IDW Publishing, cancelled)
 Magic (2021–2023, Boom! Studios)
 Magic: Master of Metal (2021, Boom! Studios)
Magic: The Hidden Planeswaker (2022, Boom! Studios)
Magic: Ajani Goldmane (2022, Boom! Studios)
Magic: Nahiri the Lithomancer (2022, Boom! Studios)
Magic Planeswalkers: Noble (2023, Boom! Studios)

Micronauts 

 The Micronauts (1979–1984, Marvel Comics)
 The Micronauts: The New Voyages (1984–1986, Marvel Comics)
 Micronauts: Karza (2003, Image Comics)
 Micronauts (2016–2017, IDW Publishing)
 Micronauts: Revolution (2016, IDW Publishing)
 Micronauts: Wrath of Karza (2017, IDW Publishing)
 Micronauts: First Strike (2017, IDW Publishing)

My Little Pony 

 My Little Pony: Friendship is Magic (2012–2021, IDW Publishing)
 My Little Pony Micro-Series (2013, IDW Publishing)
 My Little Pony: Friends Forever (2014–2017, IDW Publishing)
 My Little Pony: FIENDship is Magic (2015–2016, IDW Publishing)
 My Little Pony: Legends of Magic (2017–2018, IDW Publishing)
 My Little Pony 20/20 (2020, IDW Publishing)
 My Little Pony: Generations (2021–2022, IDW Publishing)
 My Little Pony (2022–present, IDW Publishing)
 My Little Pony: Classics Reimagined – Little Fillies (2022–present, IDW Publishing)

Power Rangers 

 Mighty Morphin Power Rangers (2016–2020, Boom! Studios)
 Mighty Morphin Power Rangers: Pink (2016–2017, Boom! Studios)
 Saban's Go Go Power Rangers (2017–2020, Boom! Studios)
 Power Rangers: Aftershock (2017, Boom! Studios)
 Mighty Morphin Power Rangers: 25th Anniversary Special (2018, Boom! Studios)
 Mighty Morphin Power Rangers: Shattered Grid Finale (2018, Boom! Studios)
 Saban's Go Go Power Rangers: Back to School (2018, Boom! Studios)
 Power Rangers: Soul of the Dragon (2018, Boom! Studios)
 Saban's Go Go Power Rangers: Forever Rangers (2019, Boom! Studios)
 Power Rangers: The Psycho Path (2019, Boom! Studios)
 Power Rangers: Ranger Slayer (2020, Boom! Studios)
 Power Rangers: Drakkon New Dawn (2020, Boom! Studios)
 Power Rangers: Sins of the Future (2020, Boom! Studios)
 Mighty Morphin (2020–2022, Boom! Studios)
 Power Rangers (2020–2022, Boom! Studios)
 Power Rangers Unlimited: Heir to Darkness (2021, Boom! Studios)
 Power Rangers Unlimited: Edge of Darkness (2021, Boom! Studios)
 Power Rangers Universe (2021–2022, Boom! Studios)
 Power Rangers Unlimited: Countdown to Ruin (2022, Boom! Studios)
 Power Rangers Unlimited: The Death Ranger (2022, Boom! Studios)
 Mighty Morphin Power Rangers (2022–present, Boom! Studios)
 Power Rangers Unlimited: The Coinless (2023, Boom! Studios)
 Ranger Academy (2023, Boom! Studios)

Rom the Space Knight 

 Rom: Spaceknight (1979–1986, Marvel Comics)
 SpaceKnights (2000–2001, Marvel Comics)
 Rom (2016–2017, IDW Publishing)
 Rom: Revolution (2016, IDW Publishing)
 Rom: First Strike (2017, IDW Publishing)
 Rom: Dire Wraiths (2020, IDW Publishing)

Stretch Armstrong 

 Stretch Armstrong and the Flex Fighters (2018, IDW Publishing)

Transformers 

 The Transformers (1984–1991, Marvel Comics)
 The Transformers UK (1984–1991, Marvel UK)
 The Transformers: Headmasters (1987–1988, Marvel Comics)
 Transformers: Generation 2 (1993–1994, Marvel Comics)
 Tales from the Beast Wars (1997–1994, 3H Enterprises)
 Transformers: The Wreckers (2001–2004, 3H Enterprises)
 Transformers: Generation One (2002–2004, Dreamwave Productions)
 Transformers: The War Within (2002–2003, Dreamwave Productions)
 Transformers: Micromasters (2002–2004, Dreamwave Productions)
 Transformers: Armada (2002–2003, Dreamwave Productions)
 Transformers: Universe (2003–2004, 3H Enterprises)
 Transformers: Energon (2004, Dreamwave Productions)
 The Transformers: Infiltration (2005–2006, IDW Publishing)
 The Transformers: Evolutions — Hearts of Steel (2006, IDW Publishing)
 The Transformers: Stormbringer (2006, IDW Publishing)
 The Transformers: Spotlight (2006–2013, IDW Publishing)
 The Transformers: Escalation (2006–2007, IDW Publishing)
 The Transformers: Megatron Origin (2007, IDW Publishing)
 The Transformers: Devastation (2007–2008, IDW Publishing)
 The Transformers: All Hail Megatron (2008–2009, IDW Publishing)
 The Transformers: Maximum Dinobots (2008–2011, IDW Publishing)
 The Transformers (2008–2011, IDW Publishing)
 The Transformers: Bumblebee (2009–2010, IDW Publishing)
 The Transformers: Last Stand of the Wreckers (2010–2011, IDW Publishing)
 The Transformers: Ironhide (2010, IDW Publishing)
 The Transformers: Drift (2010, IDW Publishing)
 The Transformers: Infestation (2011, IDW Publishing)
 The Transformers: Heart of Darkness (2011, IDW Publishing)
 The Transformers: The Death of Optimus Prime (2011, IDW Publishing)
 The Transformers: More than Meets the Eye (2012–2016, IDW Publishing)
 Transformers: Regeneration One (2012–2014, IDW Publishing)
 The Transformers: Autocracy (2012, IDW Publishing)
 The Transformers: Robots in Disguise (2012–2016, IDW Publishing)
 Infestation 2: The Transformers (2012, IDW Publishing)
 The Transformers: Monstrosity (2013, IDW Publishing)
 The Transformers: Dark Cybertron (2013, IDW Publishing)
 The Transformers: Dark Cybertron Finale (2013, IDW Publishing)
 The Transformers: Windblade (2014, IDW Publishing)
 The Transformers: Punishment (2014, IDW Publishing)
 The Transformers: Primacy (2014–2015, IDW Publishing)
 The Transformers: Drift — Empire of Stone (2014–2015, IDW Publishing)
 The Transformers: Windblade (2015, IDW Publishing)
 Transformers: Combiner Hunters (2015, IDW Publishing)
 Transformers: Redemption (2015, IDW Publishing)
 Transformers: Sins of the Wreckers (2015–2016, IDW Publishing)
Transformers: Deviations (2016, IDW Publishing)
 Transformers: Till All are One (2016–2017, IDW Publishing)
 Transformers: Till All are One: Revolution (2016, IDW Publishing)
 Transformers: Revolution (2016, IDW Publishing)
 Transformers: More than Meets the Eye: Revolution (2016, IDW Publishing)
 Optimus Prime (2016–2018, IDW Publishing)
 Transformers: Lost Light (2016–2018, IDW Publishing)
 Optimus Prime: First Strike (2017, IDW Publishing)
 Transformers: First Strike (2017, IDW Publishing)
Transformers: Bumblebee — Win If You Dare (2018, IDW Publishing)
 Transformers: Unicron (2018, IDW Publishing)
Transformers: Bumblebee — Go For the Gold (2018, IDW Publishing)
Transformers: Last Stand of the Wreckers (2018, IDW Publishing)
 Transformers (2019–2022, IDW Publishing)
 Transformers: Galaxies (2019–2020, IDW Publishing)
 Transformers '84: Secrets & Lies (2019–2020, IDW Publishing)
 Transformers: Escape (2020–2021, IDW Publishing)
 Transformers: Beast Wars (2021–2022, IDW Publishing)
 Transformers: King Grimlock (2021–2022, IDW Publishing)
 Transformers: Shattered Glass (2021, IDW Publishing)
 Wreckers: Tread & Circuits (2021–2022, IDW Publishing)
Transformers: Best of Optimus Prime (2022, IDW Publishing)
Transformers: War's End (2022, IDW Publishing)
Transformers: Best of Megatron (2022, IDW Publishing)
Transformers: Last Bot Standing (2022, IDW Publishing)
Transformers: Best of Hot Rod (2022, IDW Publishing)
Transformers: Fate of Cybertron (2022, IDW Publishing)
Transformers: Best of the Beasts (2022, IDW Publishing)
Transformers: Best of the Rarities (2022, IDW Publishing)
Transformers: Shattered Glass II (2022, IDW Publishing)
Transformers: Best of Bumblebee (2022, IDW Publishing)
Transformers: Best of Starscream (2022, IDW Publishing)
Transformers: Best of Arcee (2022, IDW Publishing)
Transformers: Best of Grimlock (2022, IDW Publishing)
Transformers: Best of Shockwave (2022, IDW Publishing)
Transformers: Best of Windblade (2022, IDW Publishing)
Transformers: Collision Course (2022, IDW Publishing, cancelled)

Visionaries: Knights of the Magical Light 
 Visionaries: Knights of the Magical Light (1987–1988, Star Comics)

Crossover events 
 The X-Men and the Micronauts (1984, Marvel Comics)
 G.I. Joe and The Transformers (1987, Marvel Comics)
 Transformers/G.I. Joe (2003–2004, Dreamwave Productions)
 Transformers/G.I. Joe: Divided Front (2004, Dreamwave Productions)
 G.I. Joe vs. The Transformers (2003, Image Comics and Devil's Due Publishing)
 G.I. Joe vs. The Transformers II (2004, Devil's Due Publishing)
 G.I. Joe vs. The Transformers III: The Art of War (2006, Devil's Due Publishing)
 G.I. Joe vs. The Transformers IV: Black Horizon (2007, Devil's Due Publishing)
 New Avengers/Transformers (2007, Marvel Comics and IDW Publishing)
 Unit:E (2011, HasLab, for San Diego Comic-Con 2011)
 Justice League/Transformers (2011, DC Comics and IDW Publishing, cancelled due to The New 52 reboot)
 The Transformers vs. G.I. Joe (2014, IDW Publishing)
 Street Fighter X G.I. Joe (2016, IDW Publishing)
 Revolution (2016, IDW Publishing)
 The Transformers vs. G.I. Joe: The Movie Adaptation (2016, IDW Publishing)
 Revolutionaries (2017, IDW Publishing)
 Hasbro Heroes Sourcebook (2017, IDW Publishing)
 First Strike (2017, IDW Publishing)
 Aw Yeah Revolution! (2017, IDW Publishing)
 Justice League/Mighty Morphin Power Rangers (2017, DC Comics and Boom! Studios)
 Rom vs. Transformers: Shining Armor (2017, IDW Publishing)
 Rom/Micronauts (2017–2018, IDW Publishing)
 When Worlds Collide (2017, Grey Global Group, for HasCon)
 Transformers vs. Visionaries (2018, IDW Publishing)
 G.I. Joe: A Real American Hero vs. The Six Million Dollar Man (2018, IDW Publishing with Dynamite Entertainment)
 Rick and Morty vs. Dungeons & Dragons (2018–2019, Oni Press and IDW Publishing)
 Transformers/Ghostbusters (2019, IDW Publishing)
 Mighty Morphin Power Rangers/Teenage Mutant Ninja Turtles (2019–2020, Boom! Studios and IDW Publishing)
 Rick and Morty vs. Dungeons & Dragons: Chapter II: Painscape (2019–2020, Oni Press and IDW Publishing)
 My Little Pony/Transformers: Friendship in Disguise! (2020, IDW Publishing)
 Transformers vs. The Terminator (2020, IDW Publishing and Dark Horse Comics)
Transformers/Back to the Future (2020–2021, IDW Publishing)
 Stranger Things and Dungeons & Dragons (2020–2021, Dark Horse Comics and IDW Publishing)
 My Little Pony/Transformers: The Magic of Cybertron (2021, IDW Publishing)
Godzilla vs. Mighty Morphin Power Rangers (2022, IDW Publishing and Boom! Studios)
Rick and Morty vs. Dungeons & Dragons: The Meeseeks Adventures (2022, Oni Press and IDW Publishing)
Mighty Morphin Power Rangers/Teenage Mutant Ninja Turtles II (2022, Boom! Studios and IDW Publishing)

See also 
 Hasbro Comic Book Universe
 Hasbro Reconstruction

References 

Hasbro
Comics based on Hasbro toys